F. A. "Pappy" Little Jr. (born October 26, 1936) is a retired United States district judge of the United States District Court for the Western District of Louisiana.

Education and career

Born in Minneapolis, Minnesota, Little received a Bachelor of Arts degree from Tulane University in New Orleans, Louisiana in 1958. In 1961, he obtained a Juris Doctor from Tulane Law School. From 1961 to 1965, he was in private practice in New Orleans. In 1965, he moved his practice to Alexandria in Rapides Parish. He remained with the Gold, Little, Simon, Weems, and Bruser firm until he was appointed in 1984 to the federal bench.

Federal judicial service

On September 11, 1984, Little was nominated to the United States District Court for the Western District of Louisiana by President Ronald Reagan to fill the position vacated by the retirement of Judge Nauman Scott, an original appointee of President Richard Nixon. Little was confirmed by the United States Senate on October 11, 1984, and received his commission the following day. He served as Chief Judge from 1996 to 2002 and then assumed senior status on May 30, 2002, serving in that status until his retirement from the bench on May 15, 2006.

While in the Western District, Little sat on some 250 cases on the United States Court of Appeals for the Fifth and Sixth circuits.

Post judicial service

Little returned to private practice in Alexandria after his judicial tenure and specializes in arbitration, mediation, and appellate review. He also lectures on the Constitution of the United States and on topics relating to taxation. Little has written for the Tulane Law Review, Tax Law Review, and Hastings Law Journal. He is also the chief judge for the Coushatta Tribe of Louisiana.

References

Sources
 

1936 births
Living people
Lawyers from Minneapolis
Louisiana Republicans
American non-fiction writers
Judges of the United States District Court for the Western District of Louisiana
United States district court judges appointed by Ronald Reagan
20th-century American judges
Tulane University alumni
Tulane University Law School alumni
Lawyers from New Orleans
People from Alexandria, Louisiana
Wikipedia articles incorporating text from the Biographical Directory of Federal Judges